Aly Camara (born 8 February 1986 in Conakry) is a Guinean professional footballer, who played for TTM Samut Sakhon in the Thai Premier League.

References

Living people
Guinean footballers
1986 births
Expatriate footballers in Thailand
Guinean expatriate footballers
Expatriate footballers in France
Expatriate footballers in Indonesia
Expatriate footballers in Gabon
AS Kaloum Star players
Association football forwards